Seasonal food refers to the times of year when the harvest or the flavour of a given type of food is at its peak. This is usually the time when the item is harvested, with some exceptions; an example being sweet potatoes which are best eaten quite a while after harvest. It also appeals to people who prefer a low carbon diet that reduces the greenhouse gas emissions resulting from food consumption (Food miles). Macrobiotic diets emphasise eating locally grown foods that are in season.

History 
The seasonal food of Korea were formed against the backdrop of a natural environment where changes in farming life and four seasons were evident, and different depending on the failure, influenced by various geographical environments. In contrast, summer diet consisted of green beans radish, lettuces, chicories, aubergine, carrots, cucumber, gherkins, watercress, marrow, courgettes, and rice.  The meat accompanied these vegetables consisted mainly of poultry, ostrich and beef products.  Fruity deserts included fruits such as lemon, lime quinces, nectarines, mulberry, cherries, plums, apricot, grapes, pomegranates, watermelon, pears, apple, and melon.  Meanwhile, the drinks involved syrups and jams. Fruit pastels, lemon, rose, jasmine, ginger and fennel.

In Autumn, meals included cabbage, cauliflower, carrots, celery, gourd, wheat, barley, millet, turnips, parsnips, onions, acorns, peanuts, pulses, and olive oil. Drinks incorporated aromatic herbs and flower distillations of essential oils.

Here are some Healthy food list which we can use in winter season. 

Healthy winter food
 Sweet Potato
 Honey
 Chicken
 Guava
 Carrot
 CLeeks
 Oats
 Yogurt
 Nuts
 Jaggery
 Fennel
 Eggs

Gallery

See also
 Slow Food

References

External links
 BBC Good Food - Seasonality table (UK)
 BBC Food - In season section
 Seasonal food calendar (note: this site requires you to enter a New York zip code. 10003 is one that will work)
 SYUN - Japanese-English Syun 旬 Seasonal Dictionary with photo (JP)

Lists of foods
Simple living